Bazvash is a village in Zhavehrud Rural District, in the Central District of Kamyaran County, Kurdistan Province, Iran. At the 2006 census, its population was 612, in 135 families. The village is populated by Kurds.

References 

Towns and villages in Kamyaran County
Kurdish settlements in Kurdistan Province